Grace Park (born 6 March 1979) is a retired South Korean professional golfer on the LPGA Tour. She was a member of the LPGA Tour from 2000 until her retirement in 2012 and won six LPGA Tour events, including one major championship, during her career.

Amateur career
Park was born Park Ji-eun (Korean: 박지은) in Seoul, South Korea. She moved to Hawaii at the age of 12, and then to Arizona. She received the 1996 Dial Award as top female high-school scholar-athlete in the United States. She attended Arizona State University and graduated from Ewha Womans University in 2003. In 2002, she won the Honda Award (now the Honda Sports Award) as the best female collegiate golfer in the nation.

Park had an outstanding amateur career in the United States being Rolex Junior Player of the Year in 1994 and 1996, winning several amateur championships in 1998 including the U.S. Women's Amateur and the Women's Western Amateur. She tied for eighth as an amateur in the 1999 U.S. Women's Open.

Professional career
Park turned professional in 1999 and decided to play on the Futures Tour instead of taking exemptions to LPGA Tour tournaments. She won five of the ten tournaments she entered and became one of the first three golfers to gain automatic LPGA Tour exempt status by finishing top of the money list. She was named Rookie of the Year and Player of the Year.

She won at least one LPGA tournament in each season from 2000 to 2004, including her only major, the 2004 Kraft Nabisco Championship. The years 2005 and 2006 were difficult for Park as she suffered from back and neck injuries, and success continued to elude her the following two seasons as well. In April 2009 it was reported that Park had undergone a successful hip surgery, and that she would be off the LPGA tour for several months.

In June 2012, Park announced her retirement from golf.

The Boston Globe has described Park as "the striking beauty, the tall and proud walk, the dazzling smile" and she has attracted sponsorship from Nike and Rolex.

Professional wins (11)

LPGA Tour (6)

LPGA Tour playoff record (0–1)

Futures Tour (5)
1999 (5) Betty Puskar FUTURES Golf Classic, YWCA Briarwood FUTURES Open, SmartSpikes FUTURES Classic, Carolina National FUTURES Classic, Greater Lima FUTURES Open

Major championships

Wins (1)

Results timeline

^ The Women's British Open replaced the du Maurier Classic as an LPGA major in 2001.

CUT = missed the half-way cut
WD = withdrew
"T" = tied

Summary
Starts – 46
Wins – 1
2nd-place finishes – 1
3rd-place finishes – 2
Top 3 finishes – 4
Top 5 finishes – 5
Top 10 finishes – 11
Top 25 finishes – 15
Missed cuts – 15
Most consecutive cuts made – 11
Longest streak of top-10s – 5

Team appearances
Amateur
Espirito Santo Trophy (representing South Korea): 1998

Professional
Lexus Cup (representing Asia team): 2005, 2006 (winners)

References

External links

South Korean female golfers
Arizona State Sun Devils women's golfers
LPGA Tour golfers
Winners of ladies' major amateur golf championships
Winners of LPGA major golf championships
Ewha Womans University alumni
South Korean emigrants to the United States
Golfers from Seoul
Golfers from Scottsdale, Arizona
South Korean Buddhists
1979 births
Living people